Frank Melvin Karsten (January 7, 1913 – May 14, 1992) was a Democratic United States Representative from Missouri.

Biography
Frank M. Karsten was born in San Antonio, Texas on January 7, 1913. His family moved to St. Louis, Missouri in 1925, and he graduated from Beaumont High School.  Karsten was a staff assistant for Congressman John J. Cochran from 1934 to 1946.  He attended National University (now George Washington University Law School) while working for Cochran, and graduated with an LL.B. in 1940.

Karsten ran to succeed Cochran in 1946.  He was elected as a Democrat to the Eightieth Congress, and was reelected 10 times, serving from January 3, 1947 to January 3, 1969). At a 1950 Congressional hearing, Karsten claimed he had seen a flying saucer. Karsten did not sign the 1956 Southern Manifesto, and voted in favor of the Civil Rights Acts of 1957, 1960, 1964, and 1968, as well as the 24th Amendment to the U.S. Constitution and the Voting Rights Act of 1965. During his time in the House, Karsten served as an assistant Democratic whip and rose to become a senior member of the Ways and Means Committee. He was a delegate to the conference for the General Agreement on Trade and Tariffs in Geneva, Switzerland in 1957, and a delegate to the British-American Parliamentary Conference from 1964 to 1965.

He was not a candidate for reelection in 1968. Karsten practiced law after leaving Congress, and in 1969 he received the honorary degree of LL.D. from Parsons College in Fairfield, Iowa.

He died in San Antonio, Texas, on May 14, 1992, and was interred in Mission Burial Park South.

References

External links

1913 births
1992 deaths
20th-century American politicians
George Washington University Law School alumni
Missouri lawyers
Democratic Party members of the United States House of Representatives from Missouri
Politicians from San Antonio
Politicians from St. Louis
Burials in Texas
United States congressional aides